The Omid Iranian Foundation is an Iranian not-for-profit non-governmental organization, established in 2009. It is officially a research institute focusing on political and social sciences. However, some analysts believe it is strategically functioning as a "reformist political party" as it has branches nationwide. The head of this foundation, Mohammad Reza Aref, has stressed the organization's goals are not political, and contends it should remain a think tank for executive officials. Others have noted the foundation's possible political activity after 2017.

See also
 BARAN Foundation

References

External links
Official website

Reformist political groups in Iran
Think tanks based in Iran
Political and economic think tanks based in Iran